The Amazing Mr. Williams is a 1939 American screwball comedy film produced by Everett Riskin for Columbia Pictures and directed by Alexander Hall. The film stars Melvyn Douglas, Joan Blondell and Clarence Kolb. It was written by Dwight Taylor, Sy Bartlett and Richard Maibaum. The film is about a police lieutenant who is too busy solving crimes to get married to his longtime fiancée, who decides to take action and get him to marry her and settle down. The film was released on November 22, 1939.

Plot
Maxine Carroll (Joan Blondell), secretary to the mayor waits impatiently for Kenny Williams (Melvyn Douglas), who gets called away by the Captain McGovern (Clarence Kolb) on police business not long after he arrives, but Maxine has enough time to try to talk him into leaving the police force to start a family. Kenny joins detective Deever (Don Beddoe) and Lieutenant Bixler (Donald MacBride) in the investigation of the murder of a circus performer, which Kenny solves with the arrest of a jealous knife thrower.

Kenny has another date with Maxine, but this time the Captain wants him to pick up Texas Buck Moseby (Edward Brophy) at the jail and take him to the penitentiary on the train. Instead of heading straight to the train however, Kenny passes Moseby off as his college friend so he can keep his date with Maxine. Moseby is introduced to Effie (Ruth Donnelly) and the four go to the beach casino, then dancing later. Maxine suspects something is not right and calls the Captain who tells her Kenny's on the train with Texas Buck Moseby, she relates to him that they are both with her, which the Captain doesn't believe. Bixler then tells the Captain that the prison warden has called and said Kenny and Moseby haven't arrived yet. The Captain, who is still on the phone with Maxine, asks her to try to keep them there as long as possible. When the cops do arrive, Moseby tries to make a run for it but Kenny is too quick for him and puts handcuffs on him. Effie faints when the Captain announces that Buck Moseby is a notorious convict and killer.

Because of the incident with Moseby, Kenny is suspended for 60 days without pay by the police commissioner at the citizens committee the following day. The Phantom Slugger who has been fatally attacking random women on the street has still not been caught and the citizens committee is in an uproar about it. Captain McGovern suggests a male policeman wear women's clothes as a decoy to try to catch the criminal. Maxine writes a note suggesting they use Kenny and hands it to the mayor, the police commissioner is willing to reinstate Kenny if he will agree to go undercover, which he does. After 48 hours Maxine is worried that neither she, nor anyone at the police force has heard from Kenny, when they find out he's been spotted at "the corner 6th and Main". Maxine goes to there to find him, but as soon as she sees Kenny the Phantom Slugger attacks her and knocks her out. Kenny struggles with the criminal, still in women's clothes, and then arrests him.

Kenny visits Maxine in the hospital who is pretending to be sicker than she is, she convinces him to turn in his resignation. The next day it is discovered that the night watchman at the First National Bank has been killed in a burglary worth $25,000. The Captain finds Kenny's resignation but needs Kenny to investigate the burglary so Bixler pretends to have resigned as well to make him interested in the investigation. Meanwhile, Maxine and Effie are planning a wedding for noon at the Mayor's office, but Kenny is late as usual. The Captain arrives and boasts that Kenny has nabbed the bank burglary criminal who is named Stanley (John Wray) and Maxine calls off the wedding. Kenny arrives but it is too late.

Stanley still insists he was forced to take part in the bank robbery by another man. Kenny discovers new evidence that might clear Stanley but he's supposed to deliver him to the prison via the train. Meanwhile, the Captain and the detectives are trying to arrest Kenny for taking Stanley off the train. Kenny enlists Maxine's help in finding the person who purchased the liquor bottle found in Stanley's car, which leads them to the racetrack to arrest the real killer.

Cast

 Melvyn Douglas as Kenny Williams
 Joan Blondell as Maxine Carroll
 Clarence Kolb as Captain McGovern
 Ruth Donnelly as Effie
 Edward Brophy as Buck Moseby 
 Donald MacBride as Lieutenant Bixler
 Don Beddoe as Deever
 Jonathan Hale as Mayor
 John Wray as Stanley
 Peggy Shannon as 	Kitty
 Luis Alberni as Rinaldo 
 James Crane as	Johnny
 Dick Curtis as 	Joe
 Eddie Laughton as 	Mousey 
 William Forrest as 	Anderson 
 Walter Miller as	Browning 
 Barbara Pepper as 	Muriel, Wedding Guest
 Sally Payne as Jean, Wedding Guest 
 Virginia Sale as 	Miss Mason, Schoolteacher
 Lorna Gray as 	Nurse 
 Robert Middlemass as 	Police Commissioner
 Robert Dudley as	Citizens Committee Man 
 Frank Jaquet as Citizens Committee Man
 Sarah Edwards as Citizens Committee Woman
 Lela Bliss as Citizens Committee Woman
 Ralph Peters as Tobacco Store Proprietor
 Milton Kibbee as Liquor Store Proprietor 
 Maude Eburne as 	Landlady
 Robert Sterling as 	Elevator Boy 
 Wyndham Standing as Elevator Passenger

Popular Culture
On July 27, 1940, opening night at the Drive In Movies in Rose City, Arkansas, the film was the first film to be featured at the four hundred car drive in theater. An estimated twelve hundred cars turned out for the event.

References

External links

 

1939 films
1930s mystery films
1930s romance films
American mystery films
American romance films
American black-and-white films
Columbia Pictures films
Films directed by Alexander Hall
American police detective films
Films with screenplays by Richard Maibaum
1930s American films